The Borderers is a British television series produced by the BBC between 1968 and 1970.

Setting 
A historical drama series, The Borderers was set during the 16th century and chronicled the lives of the Ker family, who lived in the Scottish Middle March on the frontier between England and Scotland.  Some episodes of the show depict the wider politics, mostly as it affects their relative Sir Walter Ker, warden of the Middle March

The series was described by The Guardian in 2007 as "brave and original...a kind of north-eastern western". It shows an ordinary family trying to live as part of a society of Border Reivers, a world where raid and feud were unavoidable parts of daily life.  The wars between England and Scotland had destroyed the normal processes of law enforcement.  The setting is a particularly tense time, with Elizabeth of England and Mary, Queen of Scots, in competition.  Also the struggle between Protestants and Catholics in both kingdoms.  Amidst all this, the Kers of Slitrig are trying to live an ordinary life.

The leading cast members were Iain Cuthbertson, Edith MacArthur and Michael Gambon.

Season One was produced by Peter Graham Scott, who had worked on The Avengers, Mogul, The Troubleshooters and would later go on to make The Onedin Line.

Season Two was produced by Anthony Coburn who had previously worked on Doctor Who.

In 2007, two episodes of The Borderers were part of the BBC Archive Trial.

Cast 
The regular cast were Michael Gambon as Gavin Ker (male head of the family), Edith McArthur as Margaret Ker and Iain Cuthbertson as Sir Walter Ker of Cessford. Nell Brennan as Agnes Ker (Series 1) and Eileen Nicholas as Agnes Ker (Series 2). Margaret Greig as Grizel Ker, Joseph Brady as Rab (Series 1) and James Garbutt as Rab (Series 2).  Ross Campbell as Jamie Ker and Russell Waters as Pringle (Cessford's clerk). Sir Walter Ker is a real historical figure, though little is known of him and most of what is shown in the series is invented.

Episode guide 
Of the show's 26 episodes, only 15 survive today, mainly from series 1, with 7 existing in their original colour format, the other 8 existing as black and white telerecordings.

Series 1

Series 2

References

External links 
 
 

BBC television dramas
Period television series
British adventure television series
1968 British television series debuts
1970 British television series endings
1960s British drama television series
1970s British drama television series
English-language television shows